The Dick and Paula Celebrity Special is an adult animated series that aired on FX in 1999. The premise of the show was that Dick and Paula hosted a talk show where famous individuals, usually deceased, talked about their work or what made them widely known. The guest list included Charles Darwin, Marquis de Sade, Oedipus Rex, and Lewis and Clark, among many others.  Accompanying the two hosts was a Paul Shaffer-esque keyboard player. This premise bears similarities with that of Steve Allen's Meeting of Minds.

The series, like Dr. Katz, Professional Therapist, the first season of Home Movies, and Science Court, was animated in Squigglevision, a computer animation technique that caused the edges of people and important objects to vibrate constantly.  Also like those series, Dick and Paula utilized retroscripting, in which a basic outline is given and the actors improvise the dialogue.  Later, the dialogue is edited to a coherent script.

Dick was voiced by Richard Snee, and Paula by Paula Plum. The cast also included Home Movies and Dr. Katz stars H. Jon Benjamin and Jonathan Katz.

Thirteen episodes were ordered by FX, but only six aired in July and August 1999.

In January 2000, Animation World News announced that the other seven episodes would air in March, including these highlights: "The first sighting of The Blair Witch as she discusses her 10K Run for Testicular Cancer Awareness; Joan of Arc talks about hearing voices and what she looks for in a man; Roman emperor Nero reminisces about his wild days of partying and discusses his current job as a greeter at Caesar's Palace; Satan explains his side of the falling out with God and tries to possess someone in the audience; and ventriloquist Jim Stank argues with his wife, Rochelle, a ventriloquist dummy." However, the show did not return in March, and the final seven episodes remained unaired.

Episodes

References

External links

1990s American adult animated television series
1990s American animated comedy television series
1990s American television talk shows
1999 American television series debuts
1999 American television series endings
American adult animated comedy television series
English-language television shows
Television series by Soup2Nuts
Television series created by Tom Snyder
Television series by 20th Century Fox Television
American adult computer-animated television series
Squigglevision
FX Networks original programming